Tipton Five Ways railway station was a station built by the Oxford, Worcester and Wolverhampton Railway, serving the town of Tipton in the western section near the border with Coseley for 88 years from 1853.

The 'Five Ways' tag was only added in 1950 – to avoid confusion with Tipton Owen Street. It was situated on the Oxford-Worcester-Wolverhampton Line. The station eventually closed in 1962, though the line remained open until 22 September 1968. The station buildings were demolished soon after closure.

The station site was developed in 2001–02 with new housing, which made use of most of the track bed between Sedgley Road West and Birmingham New Road. The overbridges at both ends of this section of the railway were demolished at this time.

References

Further reading

Disused railway stations in Sandwell
Railway stations in Great Britain opened in 1853
Railway stations in Great Britain closed in 1962
Former Great Western Railway stations